William Sawe (born 5 September 1955) is a Kenyan racewalker. He competed in the men's 50 kilometres walk at the 1988 Summer Olympics.

References

1955 births
Living people
Athletes (track and field) at the 1988 Summer Olympics
Kenyan male racewalkers
Olympic athletes of Kenya
Place of birth missing (living people)
African Games medalists in athletics (track and field)
African Games silver medalists for Kenya
Athletes (track and field) at the 1987 All-Africa Games
20th-century Kenyan people